Deswali Majhi is a Hinduized section of Santal tribe, distributed in western region of West Bengal and eastern region of Jharkhand. The community took shape after the great Santal rebellion (1855-56) by adoption of Hinduism due oppression faced as a Santal by the Britishers and their proximity to the Kudumi and Bengali people.

Reference

Santhal
Castes
Social groups of Jharkhand
Social groups of West Bengal
Ethnic groups in South Asia